The 6th WBPF World Championship was a major international competition in bodybuilding and fitness, as governed by the World Bodybuilding and Physique Federation (WBPF). It took place in Bombay Exhibition Centre, Mumbai, India from 5 December – 10 December 2014. More than 300 contestants from 33 countries participated in the championship.

The competition was covered by several TV stations and WBPF TV covered the news via Facebook for readers to watch the competition live.

This event was organized by IBBF led by President Baba Madhok, Secretary-General Chetan Pathare and their Organizing Chairman led by Madhukar Talwalkar and Organizing Secretary Vikaram Rothe and the Organizing 
Committee of this event.

This championship was preceded by 2013 WBPF World Championship held in Budaors, Hungary and succeeded by 2015 WBPF World Championship held in Bangkok, Thailand.

Host announcement 
On 17 August 2014 World Bodybuilding and Physique Sports Federation (WBPF) made an official announcement on their website that 6th WBPF World Championship will be held in Mumbai, India, from 5 December – 10 December 2014.

Datuk Paul Chua, Secretary General of WBPF confirmed this decision after inspection meeting with Indian government and sports officials.

Nations participants 
More than 300 contestants from 33 countries participated in 6th edition of the championship. There were competitors from all continents except North America.

21.6% of all contestants were women.

Official results 
Organizator of the championship, Indian Bodybuilding Federation (IBBF) has published official results in January 2015.

Overall winners 

Individual overall winner is Peter Molnar of Hungary who won gold medal in Bodybuilding (100 kg) category. Team overall winner in both, men's and women's competition is national team of Thailand who won 8 gold, 5 silver and 5 bronze medals, the most among participants.

Master 40-49 yrs (up to 80kg)

Master 40-49 yrs (over 80kg)

Master 50-60 yrs

Master Over 60 yrs

Women's Fitness Physique (up to 160cm)

Women's Fitness Physique (over 160cm)

Men's Fitness Physique (up to 170cm)

Men's Fitness Physique (over 170cm)

Men's Sport Physique (up to 170cm)

Men's Sport Physique (up to 180cm)

Men's Sport Physique (over 180cm)

Men's Junior (up to 70kg)

Men's Junior (over 70kg)

Women's Athletic Physique (up to 165cm)

Women's Athletic Physique (over 165cm)

Men's Athletic Physique (up to 170 + 4kg)

Men's Athletic Physique (up to 180 + 6kg)

Men's Athletic Physique (over 180 + 8kg)

Women's Model Physique (up to 160cm)

Women's Model Physique (up to 165cm)

Women's Model Physique (up to 170cm)

Women's Model Physique (over 170cm)

Women's Bodybuilding (up to 55kg)

Women's Bodybuilding (over 55kg)

Men's Bodybuilding (up to 55kg)

Men's Bodybuilding (up to 60kg)

Men's Bodybuilding (up to 65kg)

Men's Bodybuilding (up to 70kg)

Men's Bodybuilding (up to 75kg)

Men's Bodybuilding (up to 80kg)

Men's Bodybuilding (up to 85kg)

Men's Bodybuilding (up to 90kg)

Men's Bodybuilding (up to 100kg)

Men's Bodybuilding (over 100kg)

Medals table by nation 
Participants from 20 different countries were among the winners. Most medals won national team of India (twenty), most gold medals have been awarded to Thailand's contestants (eight). There were total of 102 medals awarded in 34 categories (medals of overall winners aren't included).

References

External links 
 6th World Bodybuilding And Physique Sports Championship 2014 -- IBB Indian Bodybuilding

Bodybuilding competitions
Fitness and figure competitions
International sports competitions hosted by India